The Dream Merchant may refer to:

The Dream Merchant (novel), a 2002 Dutch fantasy novel by Isabel Hoving
Dream Merchant Vol. 1, a 2005 album by 9th Wonder
The Dream Merchant Vol. 2, a 2007 album by 9th Wonder

See also
The Dream Merchants, a 1949 novel by Harold Robbins